Changing Faces is the self-titled debut studio album by American R&B duo Changing Faces. It was released by Big Beat and Atlantic Records on August 23, 1994 in the United States. Changing Faces peaked at twenty-five on the US Billboard 200. By October 1994, it was certified gold in sales by the Recording Industry Association of America (RIAA), after sales exceeding 500,000 copies in the United States.

Critical reception

Allmusic editor Alex Henderson called's Changing Faces's debut "a pleasant, if less than spectacular, start [...] In fact, pretty much everything on this CD favors a medium tempo – the New York duo doesn't inundate the listener with either ultra-slow ballads or fast, danceable material. Cassandra Lucas and Charisse Rose, collectively Changing Faces, are competent singers and while slow jams like "Thoughts of You," "Movin' On," and "Come Closer" are neither mind-blowing nor distinctive, they're likable enough [...] Even though this slick debut isn't a gem, it let listeners know that Changing Faces had potential."

Chart performance
The album peaked at twenty-five on the US Billboard 200 and topped the US Top R&B/Hip-Hop Albums. Changing Faces was certified gold by the Recording Industry Association of America (RIAA) in October 1994.

Track listing

Personnel
Information taken from Allmusic.
assistant engineering – Jim Caruana, Gus Garcas, John Schriver, Joshua Shapera
engineering – Dinky Bingham, Eric Codee, Russell Elevado, Paul Elliott, Steve George, Brian Hall, Dave Hall, Eric Lynch, Peter Mokran, Mario Rodriguez, Martin Stebbing, Jeff Stevenson
executive production – Charnise Carter, Craig Kallman, Kenny "K-Smoove" Kornegay
guitar – Keith Henderson
keyboards – Darin Whittington
mastering – Tom Coyne
mixing – Tony Maserati, Peter Mokran, Jonnie Most, Jeff Stevenson
mixing assistant – Dinky Bingham
photography – Lisa Peardon
piano – Lafayette Carthon, Jr.
production – Dinky Bingham, Eric Codee, DeVante Swing, Dave Hall, Heavy D & the Boyz, Nevelle Hodge, R. Kelly, Kenny "K-Smoove" Kornegay, Peter Mokran, Martin Stebbing, Darin Whittington, Darryl Young
programming – Peter Mokran, Martin Stebbing
vocals – Changing Faces

Charts

Weekly charts

Year-end charts

Certifications

See also
List of number-one R&B albums of 1994 (U.S.)

References

External links
 

1994 debut albums
Big Beat Records (American record label) albums
Changing Faces (group) albums